George Middleton (October 14, 1800 in Philadelphia, Pennsylvania – December 31, 1888 in Allentown, New Jersey) was an American Democratic Party politician who represented New Jersey's 2nd congressional district from 1863 to 1865.

Middleton was born in Philadelphia on October 14, 1800. He moved to Burlington, where he attended the public schools. He became a tanner and moved to Allentown, where he held several local offices. He served as a member of the New Jersey General Assembly in 1858 and 1859.

Middleton was elected as a Democrat to the Thirty-eighth Congress, serving in office from March 4, 1863 – March 3, 1865, but was an unsuccessful candidate for reelection in 1864 to the Thirty-ninth Congress.

After leaving Congress, he resumed the business of tanning. He died in Allentown on December 31, 1888, and was interred in Crosswicks Community Cemetery in Crosswicks, New Jersey.

External links

George Middleton at The Political Graveyard

1800 births
1888 deaths
Democratic Party members of the United States House of Representatives from New Jersey
People from Allentown, New Jersey
People from Burlington, New Jersey
Politicians from Monmouth County, New Jersey
Democratic Party members of the New Jersey General Assembly
19th-century American politicians